Salmin Amour (born 1942) is a Tanzanian politician who served as President of Zanzibar from 25 October 1990 to 8 November 2000. He was elected in 1990 as the sole candidate and received 98 percent of the votes. In Tanzania's first multi-party elections in 1995, Amour was accused of rigging the Zanzibari presidential election by opposition leader Seif Shariff Hamad.

References

1942 births
Living people
Presidents of Zanzibar
Chama Cha Mapinduzi politicians
Tanzanian Muslims